The Ngindo are an ethnic and linguistic group based in southern Pwani Region, eastern Ruvuma Region, southern Morogoro Region and northern Lindi Region  means in current area includes Liwale and Kilwa districts in current Tanzania or former Tanganyika, who speak the Ngindo and Ndendeule languages.  In 1987 the Ngindo population was estimated to number 220,000 
Prominent Ngindo people include. Saidi Alli Amanzi former District Commissioner of Masasi, Nyamagana, Morogoro and Singida from 2006 to 2016, Poet Amir Abdallah Sudi 'Andanenga' whose nickname Andanenga derives from two Ngindo words where anda means like and nenga means right me or me, therefore better translated as like me and some others.  
.

Ethnic groups in Tanzania
Indigenous peoples of East Africa